New World Order may refer to:

 New World Order (conspiracy theory), believing in plans for a totalitarian world government

Books 
 The New World Order (Wells book), a 1940 book
 The New World Order (Robertson book), 1991, a conspiracy theory of Christian persecution
 The New World Order of Islam, (Urdu: Nizam-e-Nau), a 1942 address by Ahmadiyya Mirza Mahmood Ahmad
 The Gulf Crisis and the New World Order, a 1990 book by Mirza Tahir Ahmad
 The New World Order, a 1990 book by A. Ralph Epperson about a Masonic conspiracy theory
 The New World Order, a 2004 science fiction novel by Ben Jeapes

Films 
 New World Order (film), a 2009 American documentary
 Captain America: New World Order, an upcoming 2024 superhero film in the Marvel Cinematic Universe

Music 
 The New World Order (album), 1996, by Poor Righteous Teachers
 New World Order (album), 1997, by Curtis Mayfield
 "New World Order", a song by Megadeth from Thirteen
 "New World Order", a song by Gamma Ray from No World Order
 "New World Order", a song by The Kovenant from Animatronic
 "New World Order", a song by The Retrosic from God of Hell
 "N.W.O." (song), a song by Ministry
 "New World Order", a song by Flatbush Zombies
 "New World Order", a recurring track in the game series Danganronpa

Television 
 "New World Order" (The Falcon and the Winter Soldier), an episode of the 2021 TV series
 Frankie Boyle's New World Order, a British TV programme

Other media 
 New World Order (video game)
 The New World Order, a sketch by Harold Pinter
 Illuminati: New World Order, a 1995 card game

Other 
 New world order (Baháʼí)
 New world order (politics), any period of major change in history
 New World Order (professional wrestling), a wrestling stable

See also 
 New World (disambiguation)
 New Order (disambiguation)
 NWO (disambiguation)
 Novus ordo seclorum (Latin for "New Order of the Ages"), US Great Seal motto
 Old Order (disambiguation)
 World Order (disambiguation)
 New World Disorder (disambiguation)